

The Los Ebanos Port of Entry is the U.S. Customs and Border Protection facility that is used to inspect passengers and vehicles entering the US from Gustavo Díaz Ordaz, Tamaulipas via the Los Ebanos Ferry. The ferry was first opened in 1950.  It is the only remaining international ferry operation on the US-Mexico border. A new border station was built in 2011.

References

See also

 List of Mexico–United States border crossings
 List of Canada–United States border crossings
 Los Ebanos Ferry

Mexico–United States border crossings
1950 establishments in Texas
Hidalgo County, Texas